No Vacancy is an American drama film directed by Kyle Saylors and starring T.C. Stallings, Dean Cain, and Sean Young.

Premise

No Vacancy is loosely based upon the true story of Brandi Michaels, a jaded local television reporter who is demoted to a rural news outlet in Central Florida just after the financial crisis of 2007–2008. She first struggles with her new location, but is slowly transformed by a recovering addict as she works a news story about a church struggling to purchase a motel for homeless families.

Production
Filming began in 2020, but due to the COVID-19 pandemic, production was halted for safety reasons.

In September 2021, as the pandemic waned in Florida, portions of the film were shot in Leesburg, Florida, the site of the original Samaritan Inn. As the filming was wrapping up, the Delta variant of COVID started to become more prevalent, so medical personnel were stationed on the set. Many of the extras and staff came from the First Baptist Church of Leesburg and around the Leesburg area.

References

External links
 

2022 drama films
2022 films
American biographical drama films
Films shot in Florida
Films about homelessness
2020s English-language films
2020s American films